Bolshoye Sverchkovo is a rural locality (a village) in Permasskoye Rural Settlement, Nikolsky District, Vologda Oblast, Russia. The population was 102 as of 2002.

Geography 
Bolshoye Sverchkovo is located 44 km southeast of Nikolsk (the district's administrative centre) by road. Maloye Sverchkovo is the nearest rural locality.

References 

Rural localities in Nikolsky District, Vologda Oblast